William Roll may refer to:
 William G. Roll, American psychologist and parapsychologist
 William Roll (diplomat), U.S. diplomat